The Axtbach is a river of North Rhine-Westphalia, Germany. It flows into the Ems near Warendorf. The Axtbach is approximately 19 miles long from headwater to mouth. The headwaters of Axtbach come from an unnamed waterway in the city of Oelde combining with Mülenbach.

See also
List of rivers of North Rhine-Westphalia

References

Rivers of North Rhine-Westphalia
Rivers of Germany